Luke Massey (born 7 July 1970) is an Australian former professional rugby league footballer who played for Cronulla-Sutherland. He is the son of rugby league administrator and coach Ron Massey.

A forward, Massey played his junior football with De La Salle and debuted for Cronulla in the 1989 NSWRL season. He was a member of Cronulla's first-grade team for four seasons, playing as either a hooker or prop.

References

External links
Luke Massey at Rugby League project

1970 births
Living people
Australian rugby league players
Cronulla-Sutherland Sharks players
London Broncos players
Rugby league hookers
Rugby league props